KBIB (1000 AM) is a radio station broadcasting a Spanish Religious format. Licensed to Marion, Texas, United States, it serves the San Antonio area.  The station is owned by Hispanic Community College.

1000 AM is a United States and Mexican clear-channel frequency; WMVP, KNWN and XEOY share Class A status.

External links

BIB
BIB